Kathryn Trueblood is an American author who lives in Washington. She is most known as a writer of fiction whose work focuses on the medical humanities. She is the recipient of the Goldenberg Prize for Fiction from the Bellevue Literary Review and the 2011 Red Hen Press Short Story Award. Trueblood's has work has been critically well received by major publishing trade magazines like  Kirkus Reviews and Publishers Weekly.

Trueblood was born and raised in California. She attended the Avalon School (California), a unified K-12 school on Catalina Island. She matriculated from University of California, Berkeley and went on to University of Washington, where she earned an Master of Fine Arts degree.

Trueblood has twice been diagnosed with a chronic illness, first Graves disease, and then Crohn's. She has been frank about the challenges of parenting with a chronic illness and the influences this has on her writing.

Bibliography 
 The Sperm Donor's Daughter (1998) Permanent Press
The Baby Lottery (2007) Permanent Press
Diary of a Slut (2014) SheBooks
 Take Daily as Needed (2019) University of New Mexico Press

References

External links 
 Official website

1960 births
Living people
University of Washington alumni
University of California, Berkeley alumni
American women writers
21st-century American women